Martres-Tolosane is a commune in the Haute-Garonne department, Southwestern France. Martres-Tolosane station has rail connections to Toulouse, Pau and Tarbes.

Geography
The commune is bordered by nine other communes: Terrebasse and Sana to the north, Mondavezan to the northeast, Palaminy to the east, Mauran across the river Garonne to the southeast, Roquefort-sur-Garonne to the south across the river Garonne to the south, Boussens to the southwest, Le Fréchet to the east, and finally by Marignac-Laspeyres to the northwest.

The river Garonne flows through the commune, forming a border between Mauran and Roquefort-sur-Garonne

Population

See also
Communes of the Haute-Garonne department

References

Communes of Haute-Garonne